Robert Brown (15 Dec 1907 – Feb 1987) was an English professional rugby league footballer who played in the 1930s.

Background
Bob Brown was born in Wigan, Lancashire, England.

Playing career

County honours
Bob Brown played , i.e. number 5, in Lancashire's 7–5 victory over Australia in the 1937–38 Kangaroo tour of Great Britain and France match at Wilderspool Stadium, Warrington on Wednesday 29 September 1937, in front of a crowd of 16,250.

Les Diables Rouges
Bob Brown was one of the players who successfully toured in France with Salford in 1934, during which the Salford team earned the name "Les Diables Rouges", the seventeen players were; Joe Bradbury, Bob Brown, Aubrey Casewell, Paddy Dalton, Bert Day, Cliff Evans, Jack Feetham, George Harris, Barney Hudson, Emlyn Jenkins, Alf Middleton, Sammy Miller, Harold Osbaldestin, Les Pearson, Gus Risman, Billy Watkins and Billy Williams.

Championship final appearances
Bob Brown played , i.e. number 5, in Salford's 3–15 defeat by Wigan in the Championship Final during the 1933–34 season at Wilderspool Stadium, Warrington on Saturday 28 April 1934.

Challenge Cup Final appearances
Bob Brown played , i.e. number 3, in Salford's 7–4 victory over Barrow in the 1938 Challenge Cup Final during the 1937–38 season at Wembley Stadium, London, in front of a crowd of 51,243.

County Cup Final appearances
About Bob Brown's time, there was Salford's 21–12 victory over Wigan in the 1934 Lancashire County Cup Final during the 1934–35 season at Station Road, Swinton on Saturday 20 October 1934, the 15–7 victory over Wigan in the 1935 Lancashire County Cup Final during the 1935–36 season at Wilderspool Stadium, Warrington on Saturday 19 October 1935, the 5–2 victory over Wigan in the 1936 Lancashire County Cup Final during the 1936–37 season at Wilderspool Stadium, Warrington on Saturday 17 October 1936, and he played left-, i.e. number 4, in the 7–10 defeat by Wigan in the 1938 Lancashire County Cup Final during the 1938–39 season at Station Road, Swinton on Saturday 22 October 1938.

References

External links

Search for "Brown" at rugbyleagueproject.org

1907 births
1987 deaths
English rugby league players
Lancashire rugby league team players
Rochdale Hornets players
Rugby league centres
Rugby league wingers
Rugby league players from Wigan
Salford Red Devils players
St Helens R.F.C. players
Wigan Warriors players